Gilb is a surname.  Notable people with the surname include:

 Dagoberto Gilb (born 1950), American writer
 Mike Gilb (fl. 2000s), American politician
 Tom Gilb (born 1940), American engineer, consultant, and author

See also
Gilb., taxonomic author abbreviation of Robert Lee Gilbertson (1925–2011), American mycologist